Jean-Marie Poitras,  (September 5, 1918 – February 27, 2009) was a Canadian senator.

Biography
Born in Macamic, Quebec, he was appointed to the Senate in 1988 representing the senatorial division of De Salaberry, Quebec. He resigned on May 25, 1993, just short of his 75th birthday and mandatory retirement. He was a member of the Progressive Conservative caucus.

In 1970, he was made an Officer of the Order of Canada for his work with Scouts Canada. In 1994, he was made an Officer of the National Order of Quebec.

See also
 List of Quebec senators

External links
 

1918 births
2009 deaths
Canadian senators from Quebec
Officers of the National Order of Quebec
Officers of the Order of Canada
Progressive Conservative Party of Canada senators
People from Abitibi-Témiscamingue